Aleksa Buha (born 21 November 1939) is a Bosnian Serb philosopher and member of the Academy of Sciences and Arts of the Republika Srpska. During the 1990s, he was the minister of foreign affairs of Republika Srpska. Buha is also a member of the Senate of Republika Srpska.

From 1996 until 1998, he was the President of the Serb Democratic Party.

References

External links
Biography on the website of ANURS

1939 births
Living people
People from Gacko
Serbs of Bosnia and Herzegovina
Academic staff of the University of Belgrade
University of Belgrade Faculty of Philosophy alumni
Members of the Academy of Sciences and Arts of the Republika Srpska
20th-century Serbian philosophers
21st-century Serbian philosophers